Jordan Alexander Love (born November 2, 1998) is an American football quarterback for the Green Bay Packers of the National Football League (NFL). He played college football at Utah State and was drafted by the Packers in the first round of the 2020 NFL Draft.

Early life and high school career
Love was born in Bakersfield, California, on November 2, 1998. His father, Orbin, died when Love was 14 years old. Love attended Liberty High School. After being told he could not play quarterback as a freshman, he was named the starter by his senior year. As a senior, Love passed for 2,148 yards and 24 touchdowns and rushed for 806 yards with eight touchdowns.  A 2-star recruit, he committed to play college football at Utah State over offers from Eastern Washington, Northern Arizona, Northern Colorado, and Sacramento State.

College career
Love redshirted his first year at Utah State in 2016.

2017
As a redshirt freshman in 2017, he played in 12 games and started the final six. He finished the season, completing 129 of 235 passes for 1,631 yards, eight touchdowns and six interceptions. Following his debut at UNLV, he was named the Mountain West Offensive Player of the Week.

2018
As a sophomore in 2018, Love started all 13 games, completing 267 of 417 passes for a school season record 3,567 yards with 32 touchdowns and six interceptions. He was named the MVP of the 2018 New Mexico Bowl after passing for 359 yards and four touchdowns. His team finished the season with an 11–2 record and ranked No. 22 on the AP poll. Following his sophomore season, he was expected to be a future NFL first-round draft pick.

2019

In 2019, Love returned to Utah State under a new head coach and offensive coordinator, and saw many teammates from his previous season graduate, including four starters on the offensive line. He again started all 13 games, completing 293 of 473 passes for 3,402 yards with 20 touchdowns and a career-high 17 interceptions. His team slid to a 7–6 record with the changes to the roster and coaching staff.

Following the end of the 2019 season, Love announced that he would forgo his senior year by entering the 2020 NFL Draft.

College statistics

Professional career

Love was drafted by the Green Bay Packers in the first round with the 26th overall pick in the 2020 NFL Draft, making him the first player from a Group of Five conference to be chosen in that draft. The Packers traded their original first round pick (30th overall) and a fourth-round pick (136th overall) to the Miami Dolphins to move up and select Love. The move shocked draft analysts and the news media, as the Packers already had a (then 2×) MVP quarterback in Aaron Rodgers. General manager Brian Gutekunst explained that Love was the top remaining player on his draft board, and said there "really wasn't anyone else [...] that we felt comfortable taking" with their first-round pick.
On July 1, 2020, Love signed his rookie four-year, fully guaranteed contract worth $12,383,470 with a signing bonus of $6,566,160. It was the first time a quarterback received a fully guaranteed contract since the rookie pay scale was changed.

2020
Due to the COVID-19 pandemic, the NFL canceled pre-season activities for the 2020 season on July 28, 2020.

On September 11, 2020, the Packers officially listed Love as the third quarterback on the depth chart to begin the season, behind Rodgers and third-year quarterback Tim Boyle, reportedly so Love could focus on his development. Love was placed on the reserve/COVID-19 list by the team on November 6, 2020, and activated four days later on November 10.

The Packers would finish the 2020 season with a 13–3 record, earning the number one seed in the NFC, and losing to the eventual Super Bowl champions Tampa Bay Buccaneers in the NFC Championship Game. Love was inactive for every game in the 2020 season, both regular season and the postseason.

2021
The Packers named Love their second-string quarterback behind Aaron Rodgers to start the 2021 season. He played in preseason games against the Houston Texans and Buffalo Bills. Love made his NFL regular season debut in the fourth quarter of a 38–3 loss to the New Orleans Saints on September 12, 2021, in relief of Rodgers. He completed five of seven passes for 68 yards and lost a fumble. His first NFL completion was a 19-yard pass to rookie receiver Amari Rodgers.

Love made his first NFL start on November 7, 2021, against the Kansas City Chiefs, replacing Aaron Rodgers, who had tested positive for COVID-19 four days earlier and was ineligible to play. Love completed 19-of-34 passes for 190 yards, one interception, and his first NFL touchdown, a 20-yard pass to Allen Lazard, during a 13–7 loss.

On December 6, 2021, Love was placed on reserve/COVID-19 list. He was activated on December 15, 2021. On January 9, 2022, against the Detroit Lions, Love relieved Aaron Rodgers in the second half, where he completed 10 of 17 passes for 134 yards and a touchdown, but also threw 2 late interceptions as the Packers lost 37–30.

2022

On November 27, 2022, Love replaced an injured Aaron Rodgers and completed six of nine passes for 113 yards and a touchdown in a 40–33 loss against the Philadelphia Eagles. Love finished the game with a 146.8 passer rating.

NFL career statistics

Regular season

References

External links

Green Bay Packers bio
Utah State Aggies bio

Living people
1998 births
Players of American football from Bakersfield, California
American football quarterbacks
Utah State Aggies football players
Green Bay Packers players